The women's 400 metres event at the 1987 Summer Universiade was held at the Stadion Maksimir in Zagreb on 13 and 15 July 1987.

Medalists

Results

Heats

Final

References

Athletics at the 1987 Summer Universiade
1987